Lorenzo Ornaghi (born 25 October 1948) is an academic who served as the minister of culture in Monti cabinet

Early life and education
Ornaghi was born on 25 October 1948 in Villasanta, Italy. He graduated with a bachelor's degree in political science from Università Cattolica del Sacro Cuore (UCSC), Milan campus, in 1972.

Career
Prior to becoming minister, Ornaghi was the rector of the UCSC from 1 November 2002 to November 2011. He is a member of the board of Avvenire, a Roman Catholic magazine. He was appointed minister of culture on 16 November 2011. His term ended in April 2013.

References

External links

1948 births
Living people
Università Cattolica del Sacro Cuore alumni
Academic staff of the Università Cattolica del Sacro Cuore
Culture ministers of Italy
Italian academic administrators